The Proceedings of the Institution of Mechanical Engineers, Part A: Journal of Power and Energy is a peer-reviewed scientific journal that covers research on the technology of energy conversion systems. The journal was established in 1990 and is published by SAGE Publications on behalf of the Institution of Mechanical Engineers.

Abstracting and indexing 
The journal is abstracted and indexed by:

According to the Journal Citation Reports, its 2013 impact factor is 0.596, ranking it 91st out of 126 journals in the category "Engineering, Mechanical".

References

External links 
 

Energy and fuel journals
English-language journals
Institution of Mechanical Engineers academic journals
Publications established in 1990
SAGE Publishing academic journals